Calocybe ionides is a species of fungus belonging to the family Lyophyllaceae.

It is native to Europe and Northern America, Japan.

References

Lyophyllaceae